James E. Katz is an American communication scholar with an expertise in new media (especially concerning the Internet, social media, and mobile phone). He has published widely and is frequently invited to comment on his research at both academic and public policy forms as well as to give interviews to media outlets.

In 2012, Katz was appointed the Feld Professor of Emerging Media at Boston University’s College of Communication. In addition, he directs its newly established Division of Emerging Media Studies and Center for Mobile Communication Studies.

Prior to his appointment, he was professor and chair of the Department of Communication at Rutgers University, NJ, USA. Also at Rutgers University, in 2012, he received the highest honor that can be bestowed on one of its faculty members, the designation of Board of Governors Professor of Communication [need citation]. Preceding his tenure at Rutgers, Katz served as a Senior Scientist directing the social science research unit at Bell Communications Research (Bellcore) Telcordia Technologies. Katz has also taught at the University of Texas, Austin, where he also served as chair of the Austin World Affairs Council. He has also served term as editor-in-chief of Human Communication Research, a flagship journal of the International Communication Association.

Since receiving his Ph.D. in Sociology from Rutgers University in 1975, he has published over 15 books on topics ranging from government and scientific policy to museums, mobile devices and the use of social media.  His books have been translated into many languages including Italian, Spanish and Japanese.  Along with Rutgers colleague Mark Aakhus he developed the concept of Apparatgeist, related to how people develop relationships with their technologies, and how they seek to find transcendental ways to communicate.  His recently published Handbook of Mobile Communication Studies (2008) has been a top-seller in the category of Computer and Internet books on Amazon. The book consists of 32 edited chapters that discuss the range of mobile phone usage around the world, much of which was originally presented at a conference held at Rutgers University in 2005.  His co-edited volume, Perpetual Contact, has been described by Work, Employment and Society as a 'collection [that] will promote further debate in fields concerning the social construction of technologies, communications and media.'

In 2013, Katz published The Social Media President: Barack Obama and the Politics of Digital Engagement (Palgrave Macmillan, 228 pp.) with Michael Barris and Anshul Jain. The study examines the White House's use of Twitter and other online tools for policy initiatives and strategic campaigns since 1992, and in particular since 2009 during Barack Obama's presidency. The authors discuss the strengths and weaknesses of social media for public engagement, and concludes that its impacts in promoting the efficiency of democratic institutions have often been exaggerated. Drawing on interviews, case studies and social-media content, the book provokes academic and popular discussions about the successes, limitations and missed opportunities in the strategic use of social media in Obama's administration.

Selected publications
Katz, James E., Michael Barris & Anshul Jain. (2013). The Social Media President: Barack Obama and the Politics of Digital Engagement. New York, NY: Palgrave Macmillan.
Katz, James E., Wayne LaBar & Ellen Lynch. (Eds.), (2011). Technology and creativity: Social media, mobiles and museums. Edinburgh, UK: MuseumsEtc.

Katz, James E. (2013). Mobile gazing two-ways: Visual layering as an emerging mobile communication service. Mobile Media & Communication, 1(1), 129-133.

Lai, Chih-Hui & James E. Katz. (2012). Are we evolved to live with mobiles? An evolutionary view of mobile communication. Social and Management Sciences. Periodica Polytechnica, 20 (1), 45-54.

  Online only: https://web.archive.org/web/20110720101827/http://rccs.usfca.edu/links.asp

References 

Living people
Year of birth missing (living people)
Boston University faculty
Rutgers University alumni